Amyntas of Lyncestis or Amyntas Lyncestes was a taxiarch of Alexander the Great. He finished sixth in the competition  in Sittacene and was appointed chiliarch or pentacosiarch of the hypaspists.

References

Generals of Alexander the Great
4th-century BC Macedonians
Ancient Lyncestians